The Belogradchik dialect is a Bulgarian dialect, member of the Transitional dialects, which is spoken on the westernmost northern slopes of the Balkan mountains in northwestern Bulgaria. It borders on the Northwestern Byala Slatina-Pleven and Vidin-Lom dialect and north, the Sofia dialect to the southeast and the Serbian Torlak dialect to the southwest.

Phonological and morphological characteristics
 Definite articles -ът, -та, -то, -те as in Standard Bulgarian
 The pronoun for 3rd person, sing. feminine agglomerative is г҄у, н҄у   instead of я and the pronoun for 3rd person plural dative is г҄им, г҄ум instead of им

For other phonological and morphological characteristics typical for all Transitional dialects, cf. Transitional Bulgarian dialects.

Sources
Стойков, Стойко: Българска диалектология, Акад. изд. "Проф. Марин Дринов", 2006

References 

Dialects of the Bulgarian language